Ronald Jack Nelson (born December 14, 1929) is an American composer of both classical and popular music and a retired music educator.

Biography
Ron Nelson was born December 14, 1929, in Joliet, Illinois. He studied composition at the Eastman School of Music at the University of Rochester, earning a bachelor's degree in 1952, a master's degree in 1953, and a doctorate in composition in 1957. His teachers at Eastman included Louis Mennini, Bernard Rogers and Howard Hanson. In 1954–1955 he studied with Tony Aubin in France at the Ecole Normale de Musique and at the Paris Conservatory under a Fulbright Grant. In 1956, Dr. Nelson joined the faculty of Brown University in Providence, Rhode Island, where he served as chairman of the music department from 1963 to 1973, retiring as Professor Emeritus in 1993.

In 1991, Dr. Nelson was awarded the Acuff Chair of Excellence in the Creative Arts, the first musician to hold the chair. His Passacaglia (Homage on B-A-C-H) was the first piece to win all three major wind band composition prizes during one period — the National Band Association Prize, the American Bandmasters Association Ostwald Award, and the Sudler International Prize. He was awarded the Medal of Honor by the John Philip Sousa Foundation in 1994. In 2006, he was awarded an honorary doctorate from Oklahoma City University.

Nelson has received numerous commissions, including those from the National Symphony Orchestra, the Rochester Philharmonic, the USAF Band and Chorus, Musashino Wind Ensemble, Aspen Music Festival and numerous colleges and universities. He has also received grants and awards from The Rockefeller Foundation, the Howard Foundation, ASCAP, and several from the National Endowment for the Arts.

Conductor Leonard Slatkin may have described Ron Nelson best: "Nelson is the quintessential American composer. He has the ability to move between conservative and newer styles with ease. The fact that he's a little hard to categorize is what makes him interesting." (Los Angeles Daily News, February 19, 1996)

Ron Nelson resides with his wife, Michele, in Scottsdale, Arizona.

Selected works

Orchestral works
 1952 Savannah River Holiday
 1958 Sarabande for Katharine in April
 1960 This Is The Orchestra
 1960 Jubilee
 1961 Toccata for Orchestra
 1969 Trilogy: JFK-MLK-RFK
 1969 Rocky Point Holiday
 1976 Five Pieces after Paintings by Andrew Wyeth
 1996 Panels (Epiphanies 11)
 1997 Resonances 11

Works for wind ensemble
 1958 Mayflower Overture
 1969 Rocky Point Holiday
 1973 Savannah River Holiday
 1982 Fanfare for a Celebration
 1982 Medieval Suite
 1983 Pebble Beach Sojourn for organ, brass and percussion
 1984 Aspen Jubilee
 1985 Danza Capriccio for solo alto saxophone and wind ensemble
 1988 Te Deum Laudamus for SATB chorus and wind ensemble
 1989 Morning Alleluias
 1989 Fanfare For The Hour of Sunrise
 1990 Resonances 1
 1991 Lauds (Praise High Day)
 1992 To The Airborne
 1992 Passacaglia (Homage on B-A-C-H)
 1994 Epiphanies – Fanfares and Chorales
 1994 Chaconne (In Memoriam...)
 1994 Sonoran Desert Holiday
 1995 Epiphanies (Fanfares and Chorales)
 1995 Nightsong (Homage Howard Hanson)
 1995 Fanfare For The Kennedy Center
 1995 Courtly Airs and Dances
 1999 Fanfare for the new Millennium for symphonic band and two antiphonal brass choirs
 2006 Pastorale: Autumn Rune
 2019 Homage to Landini

Stage works
 1954 Dance in Ruins Ballet
 1955–1956 The Birthday of the Infanta Opera for Chamber Orchestra
 1981 Hamaguchi Opera for Chamber Ensemble

Chamber music
 1982 Kristen's Song for Violin, Flute, and Organ
 1983 And the Moon Rose Golden for Cello and Piano

Choral music
 1958 Three Mountain Ballads for women's chorus or SATB
 1958 Choral Fanfare for Easter for mixed chorus and narrator
 1960 Fanfare for a Festival for mixed chorus, brass and timpani
 1961 Behold Man for men's chorus
 1962 Three Ancient Prayers for SATB and organ
 1963 Triumphal Te Deum for double chorus, brass, organ, and percussion
 1964 Oratorio: What is Man? in three movements, for narrator, soprano solo and baritone solo, mixed chorus, and orchestra]
1968 Autumn Night (women’s chorus and piano; text by Alice Streatch)
 1969 Alleluia, July 20, 1969 for mixed chorus
 1972 Prayer of Emperor of China on the Altar of Heaven, December 21, 1539 for mixed chorus and ensemble
 1977 Four Pieces After The Seasons for mixed chorus
 1981 Mass of Saint LaSalle for mixed chorus, organ, mallet instruments, pianos, and percussion
 1982 Three Nocturnal Pieces for mixed chorus, solo viola, piano and percussion
 1983 Three Settings of the Moon for women's chorus (SA), piano, marimba, and glockenspiel
 1989 Three Pieces After Tennyson for mixed chorus or TTBB
 2002 Proclaim this Day for Music for mixed chorus, brass, and percussion
 2005 Let Us Find A Meadow

References

External links
 Official Website
 Interview with Ron Nelson, December 19, 1997

1929 births
20th-century classical composers
American male classical composers
American classical composers
Brown University faculty
Eastman School of Music alumni
Living people
Musicians from Joliet, Illinois
École Normale de Musique de Paris alumni
Writers from Joliet, Illinois
20th-century American composers
Classical musicians from Illinois
20th-century American male musicians